You Are the Quarry is the seventh studio album by English alternative rock singer Morrissey. It was released on 17 May 2004 by record label Attack, and was his first album in seven years following 1997's Maladjusted. The album was a huge comeback for Morrissey; all four of its singles reached the top 10 on the UK Singles Chart, and the album itself reached number 2. The album also reached number 11 on the Billboard 200, making it Morrissey's highest-charting album in the United States.

Reception 

According to critic review aggregator Metacritic, the album received an average review score of 72/100, based on 31 critical reviews, indicating "Generally favorable reviews".

Release

The first single released to promote the album was "Irish Blood, English Heart", released on 10 May 2004. You Are the Quarry was released on 17 May 2004 by record label Attack. The album charted at number 2 in the UK.

Some versions of the packaging do not show the full frame on the cover, but only a crop of Morrissey's face, cropping out the machine gun.

Nancy Sinatra recorded a version of "Let Me Kiss You", which was released as a single which performed well on the UK Singles Chart, prior to Morrissey's own single release of the song.

In October 2004, Attack repackaged and reissued You Are the Quarry as a two-disc deluxe edition. The second disc collected the nine B-sides from the album's first three singles, as well as music videos and live TV performances from the record, including Morrissey's live performances on American TV show The Late Late Show with Craig Kilborn. The original album is available with the bonus DVD, featuring the "Irish Blood, English Heart" video, song lyrics and a photo gallery.

Track listing 

 Deluxe Edition bonus disc: video / live TV

 "Irish Blood, English Heart" (promotional video)
 "First of the Gang to Die" (from The Late Late Show, 22 July 2004)
 "I Have Forgiven Jesus" (from The Late Late Show, 23 July 2004)
 "Let Me Kiss You" (from The Late Late Show, 24 August 2004)

Personnel 

 Morrissey – vocals
 Alain Whyte – guitar, backing vocals
 Boz Boorer – guitar
 Gary Day – bass guitar
 Dean Butterworth – drums
 Roger Manning – keyboards
 Jerry Finn – production

Charts

Certifications and sales

! scope="row" |Worldwide 
|
|1,000,000
|-

Notes

References

External links 

 

Morrissey albums
2004 albums
Albums produced by Jerry Finn
Sanctuary Records albums
B-side compilation albums
2004 compilation albums
2004 video albums
Music video compilation albums
Live video albums
2004 live albums